FC Kolos Pokrovskoye is a Russian football team from Pokrovskoye, Rostov Oblast. It played professionally for one season in 1996, taking 3rd place in the Zone 2 of the Russian Third League.

Team name and location history
 1996: FC Avangard-Kolos Taganrog
 1997: FC Kolos Taganrog
 1997: FC Kolos Pokrovskoye
 1998: FC Spartak Taganrog
 2003: FC Kolos Taganrog
 2006: FC Kolos Pokrovskoye

External links
  Team history at KLISF

Association football clubs established in 1996
Football clubs in Russia
Sport in Rostov Oblast
1996 establishments in Russia